Ardin may refer to:
 Ardin, North Khorasan
 Ardin, Zanjan
 Ardin, Khorramdarreh, Zanjan Province